Chris Hass (born February 19, 1994) is an American professional basketball player for ČEZ Basketball Nymburk in the Czech Republic National Basketball League. Hass played his college basketball at Bucknell University for the Bucknell Bison of the Patriot League.

On June 1, 2017 Hass signed a one-year deal with ČEZ Nymburk a basketball club based in the Czech Republic. In 8 games Hass averaged 8.9 points, 1.7 rebounds and 1.4 assists per game in his first professional season.

References

External links
 Chris Hass at realGM

1994 births
Living people
American expatriate basketball people in the Czech Republic
Basketball players from Michigan
Bucknell Bison men's basketball players
People from Emmet County, Michigan
Shooting guards
American men's basketball players